Estádio do Zimpeto is a multi-use stadium in Zimpeto - an outlying neighborhood of Maputo, Mozambique, which was inaugurated on 23 April 2011. It is mainly used for football and was the main stadium for the 2011 All-Africa Games and 2017 Lusophony Games. It has a capacity of 42,000 spectators. The stadium was built with funds from the Chinese government.

It was constructed by Chinese company Anhui Foreign Economic Construction Group.

References

Football venues in Mozambique
Athletics (track and field) venues in Mozambique
Buildings and structures in Maputo
Sport in Maputo
Stadiums of the African Games
National stadiums
Sports venues completed in 2011
2011 establishments in Mozambique